is a feminine Japanese given name.

People with the name
Sayaka Aida (born 1975), Japanese voice actress
, Japanese swimmer
Sayaka Akimoto (born 1988), Japanese idol, singer, dancer, actress, television host, and model
Sayaka Ando (born 1981), Japanese gravure idol
Sayaka Aoki (comedian) (born 1973), Japanese comedian
Sayaka Aoki (voice actress) (born 1972), Japanese voice actress
Sayaka Araki (born 1984), Japanese fashion model and hostess
Sayaka Hirota (born 1994), Japanese badminton player
Sayaka Hobara (born 1998), Japanese badminton player
Sayaka Ichii (born 1983), member of Morning Musume
, Japanese gravure idol, television personality, actress and writer
Sayaka Itō (AV Idol) (born 1968), Japanese AV Idol
Sayaka Kamiya (born 1982), Japanese actress and model
Sayaka Kamiyama, Japanese singer, member of Thyme
Sayaka Kanda (1986–2021), daughter of J-pop star Seiko Matsuda and releases music under the name Sayaka
Sayaka Kinoshita, Japanese voice actress
Sayaka Kobayashi (born 1970), Japanese film and voice actress
Sayaka Matsumoto (born 1982), American judoka
, Japanese diver
Sayaka Minami (born 1983), new member of the J-pop group BeForU
Sayaka Ohara (born 1975), Japanese voice actress
, Japanese musician
Sayaka Shoji (born 1983), Japanese violinist
Sayaka Takahashi (born 1992), Japanese badminton player
, Japanese actress
Sayaka Yamamoto (born 1993), Japanese singer, member of NMB48

Kim Chung-seon  (1571–1642), born name Sayaka (沙也可) and often known by his pen name Mohadang, was a Japanese general who defected to Korea during the Japanese invasions of Korea (1592–1598).

Fictional characters
Sayaka, a character in the film Super Heroine Witch Hunter SAYAKA
Sayaka Yumi, heroine of Go Nagai's manga and anime Mazinger Z
Sayaka Miki, a main character in the anime Puella Magi Madoka Magica
The heroine of the video game Ape Escape 3, known as Sayaka in Japan and Europe and as Yumi in the US
Sayaka, Akuma's wife and Gotetsu's niece in Street Fighter
Sayaka Hozumi, a character in the anime Brighter than Dawning Blue
Sayaka Nagisa, a character in the Dengeki Sentai Changeman
Sayaka Mine, a character in the Yaiba

Sayaka Saeki, a character in the anime Bloom Into You
Sayaka Igarashi, a character in the anime Kakegurui
Sayaka Kanamori, a character in the anime Keep Your Hands Off Eizouken!

See also
 Sayako
 Sayoko

Japanese feminine given names